South Mountain Community College is a public community college in Phoenix, Arizona.  It is one of the ten colleges in the Maricopa County Community College District.

History
South Mountain Community College was established by the governing board of the Maricopa County Community College District on April 18, 1978. The campus was designed by local architect Bennie Gonzales, opening its doors in 1980. Serving Phoenix, Ahwatukee, Guadalupe and Laveen, South Mountain Community College offers associate degrees, certificates of completion, courses that transfer to universities and technology training to 7,500 students each year.  The college takes its name from South Mountain, which is a few kilometers to the south of campus. The main campus is in Phoenix, Arizona, with additional locations in Guadalupe and Laveen. South Mountain Community College is accredited by the Higher Learning Commission and is a Hispanic Serving Institution.

Community library
A new Library was constructed and opened in the beginning of the fall semester of 2011. This library is not only for student use, but doubles as a branch of the Phoenix Public Library, and as such, open to the general public. This new library was designed by Richard Bauer.

Northern Arizona University at South Mountain Community College
Northern Arizona University (NAU) and South Mountain Community College (SMCC) collaborate to allow students to complete their bachelor's degree on the SMCC campus after finishing their associate degree. 
NAU maintains a building on the SMCC campus and offers bachelor's degree programs.

Notable alumni

Chris Duffy
Cody Ransom

See also
 List of colleges and universities in Arizona

References

External links
 Official website

 

Educational institutions established in 1978
Maricopa County Community College District
Community colleges in Arizona
Universities and colleges in Phoenix, Arizona
NJCAA athletics